Kim Chang-Hoon  (Hangul: 김창훈; born 3 April 1987) is a South Korean football player who plays for Incheon United, having previously played for Pohang Steelers and Jeju United.

Club career 
Kim was selected by Jeju United as a draft player for the 2008 K-League season.  He played only a single match for the club (a K-League Cup game), and moved to the Pohang Steelers for 2009.  As a squad player, he made intermittent appearances for Pohang throughout 2009, including two appearances in the Asian Champions League.  Unfortunately, Kim only made a single appearance in 2010, as a substitute in a K-League Cup match against his former club Jeju United.

Club career statistics

References

External links 

1987 births
Living people
South Korean footballers
Pohang Steelers players
Jeju United FC players
Daejeon Hana Citizen FC players
Incheon United FC players
Gimcheon Sangmu FC players
K League 1 players
K League 2 players
Association football defenders